The 2023 FIVB Volleyball Women's Olympic Qualification Tournaments, alternatively the 2023 FIVB Volleyball Women's World Cup (for the tournament held in Japan) and also known as FIVB Road to Paris Volleyball Qualifier, are the three volleyball tournaments to be contested by 24 women's national teams of the  (FIVB), where the top teams will earn a place in the 2024 Summer Olympics volleyball tournament.

Hosts selection
On 16 October 2022, FIVB announced that Japan will host one of three tournaments for both men's and women's Olympic Qualification Tournaments (OQTs). The men's and women's OQTs held in Japan will traditionally use the title of World Cup Japan 2023. Later, on 8 March 2023, FIVB confirmed that China and Poland will host the remaining two tournaments for women's OQTs. China will host the men's OQTs also.

Qualification

The FIVB Olympic Qualification Tournaments (OQTs) include the 24 best-placed non-qualified teams (except Russia who is ineligible to compete in the OQTs due to the 2022 Russian invasion of Ukraine) from the FIVB World Rankings as of 18 September 2022.

Pools composition
According to the qualification system, the twenty-four teams were placed into three pools of eight teams. For the first position of each pool, FIVB reserved the right to the three hosts with the top-ranked hosted team allocated to pool A, the middle-ranked hosted team allocated to pool B, and the last-ranked hosted team allocated to pool C. The remaining twenty-one teams were allocated into seven pots of three teams based on the FIVB Women's World Rankings of 1 January 2023. The order of drawing was applied with the serpentine system. The teams for the even-number position (Pot 1, Pot 3, Pot 5, Pot 7) were drawn and then placed starting from pool C to pool A. The teams for the odd-number position (Pot 2, Pot 4, Pot 6) were drawn and then placed starting from pool A to pool C.

The draw of lots ceremony was held at the FIVB headquarter "Château Les Tourelles" in Lausanne, Switzerland, on 17 March 2023, 13:00 CET.

Draw

Notes
Teams in bold qualified for the 2024 Summer Olympics.
(): Qualification group hosts

Pool standing procedure
 Total number of victories (matches won, matches lost)
 In the event of a tie, the following first tiebreaker will apply: The teams will be ranked by the most point gained per match as follows:
 Match won 3–0 or 3–1: 3 points for the winner, 0 points for the loser
 Match won 3–2: 2 points for the winner, 1 point for the loser
 Match forfeited: 3 points for the winner, 0 points (0–25, 0–25, 0–25) for the loser
 If teams are still tied after examining the number of victories and points gained, then the FIVB will examine the results in order to break the tie in the following order:
 Set quotient: if two or more teams are tied on the number of points gained, they will be ranked by the quotient resulting from the division of the number of all set won by the number of all sets lost.
 Points quotient: if the tie persists based on the set quotient, the teams will be ranked by the quotient resulting from the division of all points scored by the total of points lost during all sets.
 If the tie persists based on the point quotient, the tie will be broken based on the team that won the match of the Round Robin Phase between the tied teams. When the tie in point quotient is between three or more teams, these teams ranked taking into consideration only the matches involving the teams in question.

Pool A (China)
 All times are China Standard Time (UTC+08:00).
 The top two teams in this pool qualify for the 2024 Summer Olympics volleyball tournament.

Result

|}

|}

Final standing

Pool B (Japan)
 All times are Japan Standard Time (UTC+09:00).
 The top two teams in this pool qualify for the 2024 Summer Olympics volleyball tournament.
 The top team in this pool reigns over the 2023 FIVB Volleyball Women's World Cup.

Result

|}

|}

Final standing

Pool C (Poland)
 All times are Central European Summer Time (UTC+02:00).
 The top two teams in this pool qualify for the 2024 Summer Olympics volleyball tournament.

Result

|}

|}

Final standing

See also
2023 FIVB Volleyball Men's Olympic Qualification Tournaments

References

2023
2023
Volleyball Qualification Tournaments
Volleyball Qualification Tournaments
Volleyball Qualification Tournaments
Volleyball qualification for the 2024 Summer Olympics
2023 in Chinese women's sport
2023 in Japanese women's sport
2023 in Polish women's sport
Olympic Qualification Tournaments Womn
Olympic Qualification Tournaments Women
Olympic Qualification Tournaments Women
Olympic Qualification Tournaments Women
Olympic Qualification Tournaments